James Grewer (1865 – 1950) was a Scottish footballer who played in the Football League for Middlesbrough Ironopolis and Stoke.

Career
Grewer was born in Dundee and started playing football south of the border at Sunderland Albion. He spent a season at Middlesbrough Ironopolis before joining Stoke in 1894. He spent four seasons at the Victoria Ground making 83 appearances scoring once.

Career statistics

References

Scottish footballers
Stoke City F.C. players
Middlesbrough Ironopolis F.C. players
English Football League players
1865 births
Footballers from Dundee
1950 deaths
Association football defenders
Sunderland Albion F.C. players